The Trans-Pecos Volcanic Field is a volcanic field located in western Texas in the counties of Brewster, Jeff Davis, Presidio, and extends into northern Mexican states of Chihuahua and Coahuila. It is the southernmost volcanic field to be documented and recorded in the continental United States. The field started volcanic activity around 48 million years ago in the middle Eocene epoch, and ended around 17 million years later in the Miocene epoch.

The Volcanic field is the result of Ancient Subduction off the western portion of the continent at the time.

Most of the volcanoes in the field are calderas. Some of the volcanoes are:
In Big Bend National Park, the Christmas Mountains caldera complex and Pine Canyon caldera complex
In Big Bend Ranch State Park, the Bofecitos mountains center and the Solitario
Near Alpine, the Paisano Volcano
In northern Jeff Davis County, the Davis Mountains Caldera Complex
In central Presidio County, the Chinati Mountain Caldera Complex, and the Oak Hills Center. 

The field is currently undergoing geological studying and researched by several colleges and the United States Geological Survey.

References

Volcanic fields of the United States
Volcanism of Mexico
Eocene volcanism
Oligocene volcanism
Miocene volcanism